Carlos d'Alessio (1935 – June 14, 1992) was an Argentina-born French composer.

Life
Carlos d'Alessio was born in Buenos Aires. He studied architecture and is interested in cinema and learn music. In 1962, he moved to New York and was introduced in the middle of the vanguard. In 1973, he drew the attention of the novelist Marguerite Duras, and became a filmmaker. The two then worked together several times.

He died on June 14, 1992, in Paris.

Scores

External links
 Carlos D'Alessio at Internet Movie Database (IMDb)

1935 births
1992 deaths
French film score composers
French male film score composers
Biography articles needing translation from French Wikipedia
Biography articles needing translation from German Wikipedia
Musicians from Buenos Aires
Musicians from New York City
20th-century American composers
20th-century French musicians
20th-century American male musicians